São Paulo Confessions is an album by the Serbian-born musician Suba—his musical account of life in that humid, foggy, and manic megalopolis.

Core musicians on the album are then 21-year-old vocalist Cibelle, and veteran percussionist João Parahyba; additional musicians include mangue band Mestre Ambrósio, and guitarists Roberto Frejat (then frontman of Barão Vermelho), Edgard Scandurra of Ira!, and André Geraissatti, and vocalists Katia B., Taciana, Joana Jones and Arnaldo Antunes.

Reception
The album was included in the publication 1001 Albums You Must Hear Before You Die.

Track listing
Written by: Tom Jobim (track 6), Antunes (track 10), Béco (track 8), Cibelle (track 8), Katia B. (track 4), Suba (tracks 1 to 5, 7 to 12), Taciana (tracks 1 and 2), Vinicius De Moraes (track 6)

 Tantos Desejos (So Many Desires) - 4:27
 Você Gosta (I Know What You Like) - 4:20
 Na Neblina (In the Fog) - 4:43
 Segredo (Secret) - 4:03
 Antropófagos (Cannibals) - 6:22
 Felicidade (Happiness) - 4:21
 Um Dia Comum (Em SP) (A Normal Day (In São Paulo)) - 4:59
 Sereia (Mermaid) - 6:00
 Samba Do Gringo Paulista (Paulista Gringo's Samba) - 4:49
 Abraço (Embrace) - 5:05
 Pecados da Madrugada (Sins Before Dawn) - 5:05
 A Noite Sem Fim (The Endless Night) - 7:02

References

External links

Mitar Subotić albums
1999 albums
Crammed Discs albums